The House of Ungern-Sternberg is the name of an old and influential Baltic-German noble family, with branches belonging to the German, Finnish, Swedish and Russian nobility.

Notable members 
 Mattias Alexander von Ungern-Sternberg (1689–1763), lantmarskalk at the Swedish Riksdag of the Estates (1742, 1746) 
 Anna Dorothea von Ungern-Sternberg (1769–1846), wife of Aleksey Grigorievich Bobrinsky
 Alexander von Ungern-Sternberg (1806–1869), Baltic German novelist, poet and painter 
 Roman von Ungern-Sternberg (1886–1921), Russian general, White Movement warlord
 Erich von Ungern-Sternberg (1910–1989), Finnish architect
 
 , German Diplomat, former ambassador to Iran and Indonesia

Patron of the University of Latvia 
Jürgen von Ungern-Sternberg is a silver patron of the University of Latvia Foundation. Supports the University of Latvia since 1999 by donating to establish a scholarship in memory of his grandfather Bernhard Holander. It will be awarded to the best doctor or master of the Faculty of History and Philosophy of the University of Latvia.

References

External link

Ungern-Sternberg
Livonian noble families
Ungern-Sternberg
Ungern-Sternberg
Ungern-Sternberg
Finnish families of German ancestry
Families of Hungarian ancestry
Compound surnames